No. 304 (Land of Silesia) Polish Bomber Squadron was a Polish World War II bomber unit. It fought alongside the Royal Air Force under their operational Command and operated from airfields in the United Kingdom, serving from April 1941 as a bomber unit in RAF Bomber Command, from May 1942 as an anti-submarine unit in RAF Coastal Command and from June 1945 as a transport unit in RAF Transport Command.

History

Bomber Command 
304 Squadron was created on 23 August 1940 at RAF Bramcote, and from 1 December 1940 it operated from RAF Syerston, as a part of No. 1 Bomber Group (along with No. 305 Squadron created at the same time). It was declared ready for operations with Vickers Wellington Mk I medium bombers on 24 April 1941.  The personnel included 24 entirely Polish air crews (initially three-men, later six-men) and approximately 180 ground crew. On the night of 24/25 April 1941 two crews flew the squadron's first combat mission against fuel tanks in Rotterdam. In the following months the squadron joined the night bombing campaign over Germany and France. First losses occurred on 6 May and 8 May 1941 (in the second instance, a crew of the British advisor w/cdr W. Graham). On 20 July 1941 the squadron moved to RAF Lindholme base. In 1941 the squadron completed 214 missions lasting 1,202 hours, losing 47 killed airmen.

In first four months of 1942 the intensity of operations increased. Due to large losses suffered in early 1942, including six crews lost in April, and difficulties in recruiting replacements, it was decided to transfer the squadron to RAF Coastal Command. While in Bomber Command the squadron completed 488 missions in 2,481 hours, dropping some 800 tons of bombs, losing 102 airmen KIA or MIA and 35 POW.

Coastal Command 
On 10 May 1942 the squadron was transferred to RAF Coastal Command along with the Wellington aircraft. From 14 May 1942 it based at RAF Tiree, from 13 June 1942 at RAF Dale. Apart from patrolling duties over the Bay of Biscay, seven crews took part in a thousand-aircraft raid at Bremen on 25/26 June 1942 (losing one crew). Several times Polish crews attacked U-boats and fought with German long-range aircraft. On 13 August 1942 the Squadron was credited with sinking a U-boat, though this was not confirmed post-war. On 2 September 1942 one Wellington inflicted damage to Italian Reginaldo Giuliani submarine. A noteworthy event was a skirmish of one Wellington with six German Junkers Ju 88 on 16 September 1942 over the Bay of Biscay; The Polish aircraft was badly shot, but managed to hide in clouds, and claimed one Ju 88 shot down. On 9 February 1943 one Wellington evaded attacks by four Ju 88 for nearly an hour until they ran out of ammunition, and escaped with two Polish crewmen injured; similar combat with four Ju 88 took place on 5 September 1943, without losses, in spite of 116 bullet holes found.

From 30 March 1943 the squadron based at RAF Docking, from 10 June 1943 at RAF Davidstow Moor (equipped with radar-fitted Wellington Mk XIII), from 20 December 1943 at RAF Predannack, from 19 March 1944 at RAF Chivenor. On 4 January 1944 a Wellington strafed and damaged German submarine U-629. On 18 June 1944 the squadron was credited with sinking a U-boat, but its identity is unknown. It was quoted to be U-441, but it has been negated afterwards, and possible victims remain U-988 or U-1191. From 19 September 1944 it was based at RAF Benbecula, from 5 March 1945 at RAF St Eval. On 2 April 1945 one Wellington sunk German submarine U-321 with depth charges.

In Coastal Command the squadron undertook 2,451 missions in 21,331 hours, losing 19 aircraft and 69 KIA, 6 MIA and 31 killed in non-combat flights. It claimed 31 submarine attacked and was credited with two U-boats sunk and five damaged, it also claimed three aircraft shot down, three probable and four damaged.

Its last mission was on 30 May 1945, looking out for possible German submarines that would not surrender.

Transport Command 
After the end of the war in Europe, on 14 June 1945 the squadron was transferred to Transport Command, and operated scheduled services with Warwick C.3s to Greece and Italy. From April 1946 onwards the Polish squadrons were restricted to flights within the UK. In May the squadron converted to Halifax Mk C.8 unarmed transports and was disbanded a few months later on 18 December 1946.

Aircraft operated

Squadron bases
The squadron operated from the following airfields:

Commanding officers
Officers commanding No. 304 Squadron were as follows:

Ppłk. - podpułkownik - equivalent w/cdr; Mjr. - major - equivalent s/ldr; Kpt. - kapitan - equivalent f/lt

See also
 Air Force of the Polish Army
 List of Royal Air Force aircraft squadrons
 Polish Air Forces
 Polish Air Forces in Great Britain
 Polish contribution to World War II

References

Notes

Bibliography

 Halley, James J. The Squadrons of the Royal Air Force & Commonwealth, 1918 -1988. Tonbridge, Kent, UK: Air Britain (Historians) Ltd., 1988. .
 Jaworzyn, Josef F. No place to Land: A Pilot in Coastal Command. London, William Kimber, 1984. .
 Jefford, C.G. RAF Squadrons, a Comprehensive Record of the Movement and Equipment of all RAF Squadrons and their Antecedents since 1912. Shrewsbury: Airlife Publishing, 1998 (second edition 2001). .
 Konarski, Mariusz. 304 Squadron. Sandomierz, Poland/Redbourn, UK: Mushroom Model publications, 2005. .

 Moyes, Philip J.R. Bomber Squadrons of the RAF and their Aircraft. London: Macdonald and Jane's (Publishers) Ltd., 1964 (new edition 1974). .
 Rawlings, John D.R. Coastal, Support and Special Squadrons of the RAF and their Aircraft. London: Jane's Publishing Company Ltd., 1982. .
 Sturtivant, Ray ISO and John Hamlin. RAF Flying Training and Support Units since 1912. Tonbridge, Kent, UK: Air-Britain (Historians) Ltd., 1997, .

External links

 Photo Gallery of 304 Squadron
 Personnel of the Polish Air Force in Great Britain 1940-1947

304
304
Military units and formations established in 1940
Military units and formations disestablished in 1946